Pirabad (also Romanized as Pīrābād) is a village in Zhan Rural District, in the Central District of Dorud County, Lorestan Province, Iran. At the 2006 census, its population was 1,004, in 214 families.

References 

Towns and villages in Dorud County